The New Adventures of Charlie Chan is a crime drama series that aired in the United States in syndicated television from June 1957, to 1958. The first five episodes were made by Vision Productions in the United States, before production switched to the United Kingdom under ITC Entertainment and Television Programs of America.

Overview
The series, consisting of 39 half-hour monochrome episodes, follows the investigations of the fictional detective Charlie Chan, created by Earl Derr Biggers in 1925. The series follows the convention, established in the Charlie Chan films, of having the Asian character Chan played by a Western actor while his son(s) were played by actual Asians.

James Hong, who played Number One Son, said J. Carrol Naish had Hong fired from the show after Naish engaged in a racist outburst.

Cast

Main
 J. Carrol Naish as Charlie Chan
 James Hong as Barry Chan, "Number One Son"

Guest stars
Guest stars, most notably under ITC, include:

 Honor Blackman
 Southern Television chief announcer Brian Nissen
 Patrick Troughton

Episode list

Season 1
This list appears to be in production order. The first five episodes were filmed in the US by Vision, the remaining episodes in the UK by ITC.
 "Your Money or Your Wife"
 "Secret of the Sea"
 "The Lost Face"
 "Blind Man's Buff"
 "The Great Salvos"
 "The Counterfeiters"
 "The Death of a Don"
 "Charlie's Highland Fling"
 "The Patient in Room 21"
 "The Rajput Ruby"
 "The Final Curtain"
 "Death at High Tide"
 "The Circle of Fear"
 "An Exhibit in Wax"
 "Backfire"
 "Patron of the Arts"
 "A Hamlet in Flames"
 "Dateline: Execution"
 "The Sweater"
 "The Noble Art of Murder"
 "Three Men on a Raft"
 "No Holiday for Murder"
 "No Future for Frederick"
 "Safe Deposit"
 "Voodoo Death"
 "The Expatriate" (aka "Ex-Patriot")
 "The Airport Murder Case"
 "The Hand of Hera Dass"
 "The Chippendale Racket"
 "The Invalid"
 "The Man in the Wall"
 "Something Old, Something New"
 "The Man with 100 Faces"
 "The Point of No Return"
 "A Bowl By Cellini"
 "Without Fear"
 "Kidnap"
 "Rhyme or Treason"
 "Three for One"

Comic book
DC Comics published a six-issue comic adaptation from June 1958 to April 1959, written by John Broome and drawn by Sid Greene.

References

External links
 

1957 American television series debuts
1958 American television series endings
1957 British television series debuts
1950s British crime television series
1950s American crime drama television series
Black-and-white American television shows
Black-and-white British television shows
British crime television series
British drama television series
Works based on Charlie Chan
English-language television shows
First-run syndicated television programs in the United States
Television shows based on American novels
Television series by ITC Entertainment